Risida is a rurban village in Bhawanipatna subdivision of Kalahandi district, Odisha state, India: It is an educational and urban center located in the Northeast of kalahandi. Risida is a cluster of three revenue villages of Risida Kumbharpada, Risida Kandhapara and Salandiamunda.     

Risida is well connected to the district headquarter and towns i.e., Bhawanipatna, Balangir, Kesinga, M. Rampur, Titlagarh , Bargarh, BBSR and Cuttack by Bus. A Police Outpost, Sub Post office, Telephone exchange office and Revenue Inspector Office with bunglow is present here.

Education
 Ed.care Public School, Risida
 Saraswati Shishu Vidya Mandir, Risida
 SAIEC, Risida
 Bapuji Govt HS, Risida
 Government HS, Risida
 JK HSS, Risida
 JD College, Risida

Pre School

• AWC, Kumbharpada

• AWC, Kandhapara

• AWC, Harijanpada

• AWC, Salandiamunda

• AWC, Matrupuri

• AWC, Bahalmunda